Wyoming Highway 36 (WYO 36) is a  north–south Wyoming state highway located in south-central Big Horn County and acts as a bypass west of Basin.

Route description
Wyoming Highway 36 is a state highway in Basin. Known locally as Golf Course Road, WYO 36 travels from Wyoming Highway 30 in Basin, north, paralleling US 16/US 20/WYO 789 northwest of Basin, passes by Midway Golf Club and ends at US 16/US 20/WYO 789 north of Basin at 2.76 miles.

Major intersections

References

 Official 2003 State Highway Map of Wyoming

External links 

 Wyoming State Routes 000-099
 WYO 36 - US-16/US-20/WYO 789 to WYO 30

Transportation in Big Horn County, Wyoming
036